The 2013 German motorcycle Grand Prix was the eighth round of the 2013 MotoGP season. It was scheduled to be held at the Sachsenring in Hohenstein-Ernstthal on 14 July 2013.

In Moto2, Kalex rider Xavier Siméon secured his first pole position, the first for a Belgian rider since Didier de Radiguès took pole position in the 250cc class at the 1989 Belgian motorcycle Grand Prix.

In MotoGP, Jorge Lorenzo and Dani Pedrosa were forced out of the event due to injuries.

Classification

MotoGP

Moto2

Moto3

Championship standings after the race (MotoGP)
Below are the standings for the top five riders and constructors after round eight has concluded.

Riders' Championship standings

Constructors' Championship standings

 Note: Only the top five positions are included for both sets of standings.

References

German motorcycle Grand Prix
German
Motorcycle Grand Prix
German motorcycle Grand Prix